Tanka Tanka can mean:

 Tanka Tanka (La Paz), a mountain in La Paz Department, Bolivia
 Tanka Tanka (Oruro), a mountain in Oruro Department, Bolivia
 Tanqa Tanqa, an archaeological site in Peru